Świerszczyk (Polish for little cricket) is an illustrated Polish children's biweekly magazine published since 1945. The publisher of the magazine is Nowa Era. Many popular Polish authors for children, such as Hanna Januszewska, Jan Brzechwa, Ewa Szelburg-Zarembina, Olga Siemaszkowa, Lucyna Krzemieniecka and Jan Marcin Szancer wrote for the publication, and Jeż Jerzy, a popular modern Polish comic, debuted there.

Footnotes

References

Zofia Redlarska, Czytelnictwo prasy dziecięcej— literackie oblicze Świerszczyka— pisma dla dzieci, chapter in Media elektroniczne – kreujące obraz rodziny i dziecka, pod redakcją Jadwigi Izdebskiej, Białystok 2008, ss. 280–294,

External links

Official homepage
Świerszczyk: Tygodnik dla dzieci 1945 edition, Digital Library of the University of Łódź 

1945 establishments in Poland
Biweekly magazines
Magazines established in 1945
Children's magazines published in Poland
Polish-language magazines